The Diocese of Evansville is a diocese of the Catholic Church in Southwestern Indiana.
 
On October 21, 1944, the then-Diocese of Indianapolis was split into the Archdiocese of Indianapolis and the Diocese of Evansville. At the same time, all of Indiana split away from the Ecclesiastical Province of Cincinnati to form the new Ecclesiastical Province of Indianapolis, of which the Diocese of Evansville is a suffragan see.

Statistics and extent 
The Diocese of Evansville includes all or part of 12 counties in Southwestern Indiana, (of note Harrison Township in Spencer County, the location of St. Meinrad Archabbey, is part of the Archdiocese of Indianapolis.)

As of 2014, it pastorally served 90,800 Catholics (17.8% of 510,626 total) in 69 parishes (grouped into 4 deaneries) and 4 missions with 71 priests (66 diocesan, 5 religious), 59 deacons, 234 lay religious (6 brothers, 228 sisters) and 10 seminarians.

History

The Diocese of Evansville was founded on October 21, 1944, at which time it included 5 deaneries (Evansville, Jasper, Vincennes, Princeton, and Washington), 63 parishes and missions, 49,737 Catholics, and 75 diocesan priests.  Henry Grimmelsman, a priest of the Archdiocese of Cincinnati and rector of the Pontifical College Josephinum in suburban Columbus, Ohio, was named the first bishop, and Assumption Church in downtown Evansville was named the cathedral.  The diocese purchased the John Augustus Reitz Home from the Daughters of Isabella for use as the chancery and bishop's residence.

The Catholic population of the diocese grew rapidly in the post-war years and 12 new parishes were founded between 1944 and 1962 among suburban areas of Evansville and Jasper and the small towns of Fort Branch and Bloomfield, while mission churches in New Harmony and Oakland City were elevated to parish status.  The population growth necessitated the building of new schools as well, and three high schools in Evansville – Mater Dei on the west side, Rex Mundi on the north side, and Magister Noster, a high school seminary – were founded, along with high schools in Ferdinand, Loogootee, and Vincennes, and a college operated by the Sisters of St. Benedict in Ferdinand.  Catholic social institutions also experienced growth with the founding of Memorial Hospital, sponsored by the Sisters of the Little Company of Mary, in Jasper, and the construction of a new facility on Evansville's east side for St. Mary's Medical Center, sponsored by the Daughters of Charity.

In contrast to other areas of the diocese, the population of downtown Evansville was experiencing decline, and Assumption Cathedral was closed in 1965.  The buildings were razed and the land sold for use in the construction of a new government complex (the federal building stands on the former Assumption site).  Holy Trinity church, also downtown, and the home of the chancery since 1957, was named the pro-cathedral, or temporary cathedral. Although the church lost its status as cathedral, the old cathedra remains the most prominent feature within the oratory.

1965 also brought the retirement of Bishop Grimmelsman.  Paul Leibold, an auxiliary bishop in Cincinnati, was appointed to lead the Evansville diocese.   Bishop Leibold left the diocese just over three years later, though, when he was appointed archbishop of Cincinnati.  Francis Shea of the Diocese of Nashville was named Evansville's third bishop in 1969.

A new mission church was opened in the growing town of Santa Claus in 1967, and in 1970, St. Francis Xavier church in Vincennes, the oldest parish in Indiana, was named a basilica. Although the two nursing homes in the diocese, St. John Home in Evansville and the Providence Home in Jasper, both built expanded facilities in the 1970s, the strong growth of diocesan institutions generally abated in that decade.  The recently opened high schools in Ferdinand and Loogootee were sold to the local public school districts.  Rex Mundi and Magister Noster High Schools in Evansville were closed; Rex Mundi was sold to Ivy Tech Community College, and the chancery moved from Holy Trinity church to the former Magister Noster building.  St. Benedict College in Ferdinand was closed, and the high schools in Vincennes consolidated.  In Sullivan County, two mission churches, St. Ann in Shelburn and Our Lady of Perpetual Help in Dugger, closed in 1978 and 1982, respectively.

Bishop Shea retired in 1989, and Gerald Gettelfinger, the vicar general of the Archdiocese of Indianapolis, was appointed the diocese's fourth bishop.  Several parishes built new churches in the 1990s, and the mission in Santa Claus, the last in the diocese, became a parish.  As the number of priests in the diocese began to decline and population shifted from rural areas to suburban areas, three rural parishes in Daviess County, St. Patrick in Corning, St. Mary in Barr Township, and St. Michael, north of Montgomery, were closed in 1997.  St. Patrick and St. Mary became chapels, while St. Michael was razed.  In 1999, Bishop Gettelfinger named St. Benedict, the largest church building in Evansville, as the new cathedral for the diocese, which had not had a permanent cathedral since Assumption was closed in 1965.

Recognizing the influx of Latin American Catholics into the diocese, a Hispanic ministry center was opened in 2000.  Although the number of priests continued to decrease, the diocese began to ordain several large classes of permanent deacons.  In 2008, St. Mary and St. Simon parishes in Washington merged to become Our Lady of Hope Parish, and St. Mary church was closed and razed.  Faced with a declining number of priests and demographic shifts, the diocese began a formal planning process beginning in 2009 to allocate resources for the future.  A new high school, named for Pope John Paul II, was opened in Jasper in 2009; however the school was closed at the end of the 2011/12 school year due to low enrollment.
In 2011, Charles Thompson, the vicar general of the Archdiocese of Louisville was appointed the fifth bishop of the diocese, replacing the retiring Bishop Gettelfinger.

On July 1, 2014, a decree from Bishop Thompson merged several parishes, since the population no longer demanded as many parishes as it did during the mid-20th century. At the same time, the Diocese returned to enforcing a long-waived rule that no priest may say Mass more than three times on Sunday (including the evening vigil on Saturday), meaning some churches in the newly merged parishes would have no Sunday Masses at all.

Bishops of Evansville
 Henry Joseph Grimmelsmann (1944-1965)
 Paul Francis Leibold (1966-1969), appointed Archbishop of Cincinnati
 Francis Raymond Shea (1969-1989)
 Gerald Andrew Gettelfinger (1989-2011)
 Charles Coleman Thompson (2011-2017), appointed Archbishop of Indianapolis
 Joseph M. Siegel (2017–present)

Parishes 
Parish names in bold print. Except where otherwise indicated, a parish consists of a single church bearing the same name.

South Deanery
 Evansville, Daylight, and Warrick County
 Dean: Rev. Phil Kreilein
12 parishes as of July 1, 2016

Evansville
St. Benedict Parish (cathedral)
Resurrection Parish
Holy Redeemer Parish
All Saints Parish
St. Anthony of Padua Church (parish church)
St. Joseph Church
Annunciation of the Lord Parish
Christ the King Church (parish church)
Holy Spirit Church
Good Shepherd Parish
Most Holy Rosary of the Blessed Virgin Mary Parish
St. Boniface Parish
St. Boniface Church (parish church)
Sacred Heart of Jesus Church
St. Agnes, Virgin and Martyr Church
Sts. Mary and John Parish
St. Mary Church (parish church)
St. John the Apostle Church
Boonville
St. Clement Parish
St. Clement Church
St. Rupert Church, Red Brush
Daylight
St. John the Evangelist Parish
Newburgh
St. John the Baptist Parish

North Deanery
 Greene, Knox, Sullivan, Daviess, and Martin Counties

 Dean: Rev. David Fleck
9 parishes as of July 1, 2016

Vincennes
St. Francis Xavier Parish
St. John the Baptist Church (parish church)
The Basilica of St. Francis Xavier (minor basilica)
Sacred Heart of Jesus Church
St. Thomas the Apostle Church, St. Thomas
St. Vincent de Paul Church
Bicknell
St. Philip Neri Parish
Bloomfield
Holy Name of Jesus Parish
Jasonville
St. Joan of Arc Parish
Linton
St. Peter Parish
Loogootee
St. John the Evangelist Parish
St. John the Evangelist Church (parish church)
Immaculate Conception Church, Shoals
St. Joseph Church, Bramble
St. Martin of Tours Church, Whitfield
St. Mary Chapel, Barr Township
Montgomery
St. Peter Parish
St. Peter Church (parish church)
All Saints Church, Cannelburg
St. Patrick Chapel, Corning
St. Michael the Archangel cemetery and property, Daviess County
Sullivan
St. Mary Parish
Washington
Our Lady of Hope Parish

East Deanery
 Dubois and Spencer Counties

 Dean: Rev. Raymond Brenner
12 parishes as of July 1, 2016

Jasper
St. Joseph Parish
Holy Family Parish
Precious Blood of Our Lord Jesus Christ Parish

Celestine
St. Peter Celestine Parish
St. Peter Celestine Church (parish church)
St. Raphael Parish, Dubois
Chrisney
St. Martin I Parish
St. Martin I Church (parish church)
St. John Chrysostom Church, New Boston

Dale
St. Francis of Assisi Parish
St. Joseph Church (parish church)
Mary, Help of Christians Church, Mariah Hill
St. Nicholas Church, Santa Claus

Ferdinand
St. Ferdinand Parish

Huntingburg
St. Mary Parish

Ireland
Annunciation of the Blessed Virgin Mary Parish

Rockport
St. Bernard Parish

 St. Anthony
Divine Mercy Parish
St. Anthony of Padua Church (parish church)
Sacred Heart of Jesus Church, Schnellville

 St. Henry
St. Henry Parish

West Deanery
 Gibson County, Pike, and Posey Counties, and Vanderburgh County west of Evansville
 Dean: Rev. Anthony Ernst effective June 29, 2016
13 parishes as of July 1, 2015

Princeton
St. Joseph Parish
Evansville
Corpus Christi Parish
Ft. Branch
Holy Cross Parish
Haubstadt
Ss. Peter and Paul Parish
Mt. Vernon
St. Matthew Parish
Oakland City
Blessed Sacrament Parish
Petersburg
Ss. Peter and Paul Parish
Poseyville
St. Francis Xavier Parish
St. Francis Xavier Church (parish church)
Holy Angels Church, New Harmony
St. James
St. James Parish
St. Joseph
St. Joseph Parish
St. Philip
St. Philip the Apostle Parish
St. Wendel
St. Wendel Parish
Snake Run
St. Bernard Parish

Religious Orders 

Several religious orders are active in the diocese:
 Congregation of Divine Providence
 Daughters of Charity
 Order of St. Benedict
Sisters from Monastery Immaculate Conception in Ferdinand, Indiana
Sisters from Our Lady of Grace Monastery in Beech Grove, Indiana
 Poor Clare Sisters, who have a monastery southwest of Evansville
 Sisters of the Blessed Sacrament
 Sisters of the Little Company of Mary
 Sisters of the Third Order Regular of St. Francis
 Sons of Divine Providence
 The Little Sisters of the Poor also served in the diocese at St. John's Home for the Aged, Evansville for 131 years, before selling the home to a private management company in November 2013 due to declining vocations.

Catholic Education 

Primary Schools

 St. Benedict School, Evansville
 Christ the King School, Evansville
 Good Shepherd School, Evansville
 Holy Rosary School, Evansville
 Holy Spirit School, Evansville
 Corpus Christi School, Evansville
 Holy Redeemer School, Evansville
 Resurrection School, Evansville
 Westside Catholic School, Evansville
 St. Joseph School, St. Joseph
 St. Matthew School, Mt. Vernon
 St. Philip School, St. Philip
 St. Wendel School, St. Wendel
 Holy Trinity Catholic School, Jasper
 St. Bernard School, Rockport
 St. John the Baptist School, Newburgh
 Holy Cross School, Fort Branch
 Ss. Peter and Paul School, Haubstadt
 St. Joseph School, Princeton
 St. James School, St. James
 Flaget Elementary School, Vincennes
 Washington Catholic Elementary School, Washington

Secondary Schools
 Mater Dei High School, Evansville
 Reitz Memorial High School, Evansville
 Rivet Middle/High School, Vincennes
 Washington Catholic Middle/High School, Washington

Healthcare 
Hospitals
 St. Vincent (formerly St. Mary's Medical Center), Evansville - Sponsored by the Daughters of Charity
 Memorial Hospital, Jasper - Sponsored by the Sisters of the Little Company of Mary

Nursing Homes
 Providence Home, Jasper - Sponsored by the Sons of Divine Providence

Diocesan Arms

See also 
 List of Catholic dioceses in the United States

References

Former High Schools
 Rex Mundi High School - Evansville 
 John Paul the Great High School - Jasper

Sources and external links 
 Roman Catholic Diocese of Evansville Official Site
 GCatholic, with Google map - data for most sections

 
Religious organizations established in 1944
Roman Catholic Ecclesiastical Province of Indianapolis
Roman Catholic Dioceses in Indiana
Roman Catholic dioceses in the United States
Southwestern Indiana
Roman Catholic dioceses and prelatures established in the 20th century
1944 establishments in Indiana